La Laguna is a corregimiento in Calobre District, Veraguas Province, Panama with a population of 774 as of 2010. Its population as of 1990 was 1,033; its population as of 2000 was 881.

References

Corregimientos of Veraguas Province